The 2019–20 Premier League was the 28th season of the Premier League, the top English professional football league, since its establishment in 1992, and the 121st season of top-flight English football overall. The season started on 9 August 2019 and concluded on 26 July 2020. Manchester City were the defending champions for the second successive year, after picking up the domestic treble the previous season. Liverpool won their first league title since 1990, the club's first of the Premier League era and nineteenth overall.

Over the season, Liverpool set a number of English top-flight records including the earliest title win (with seven games to spare), the biggest points lead at any time (25), and the most consecutive home wins (24, of which 7 were carried over from the previous season).

The season was halted for over three months, following a decision on 13 March 2020 by the Premier League to suspend the league after a number of players and other club staff became ill due to the COVID-19 pandemic. The initial suspension, until 4 April, was then extended to mid-June. The season recommenced with two matches on 17 June and a full round of matches played over the weekend of 19–22 June.

In 2019–20, the video assistant referee (VAR) review system was introduced. Changes to the laws affecting backpasses, penalties, handballs and substitutions were also introduced in 2019–20.

Summary 
The Premier League season marked the start of a new three-year TV deal. One key change was that eight matches were shown on television at 19:45 on Saturdays across the season, broadcast by Sky Sports. Further, Amazon broadcast two rounds of fixtures in December, including the Merseyside derby, marking the first time an entire round of live matches had been broadcast domestically.

It was the first Premier League season to have a mid-season break in February. Three games of a normal round of ten were played on the weekend 8–9 February 2020, six games on the following weekend 14–17 February and the tenth game, Manchester City versus West Ham United, was rescheduled from 9 February to 19 February due to Storm Ciara. Games played on the same day had separate time slots such that the games did not overlap.

Title race 
With Manchester City and Liverpool achieving 98 and 97 points respectively in the 2018–19 season, many expected another close race for the title. Liverpool started the season in strong form with eight consecutive wins, while City suffered a shock defeat to newly promoted Norwich City. Liverpool's 3-1 win over City at Anfield in November opened up a nine-point lead over their rivals and they maintained their lead for the remainder of the season.

On 25 June 2020, Manchester City lost 2–1 to Chelsea at Stamford Bridge, mathematically confirming Liverpool as champions and marking their first league title in 30 years, and their first of the Premier League era.
Upon winning the league, Liverpool claimed the unusual achievement of winning the Premier League earlier than any other team by games played (with seven games remaining) and later than any other team by date (the only team to clinch the title in the month of June).

Records and achievements 
On 25 October 2019, Leicester City broke the Premier League record – as well as the all-time English top-flight record – for the largest away league win and equalled the biggest ever Premier League win when they defeated Southampton 9–0 at St Mary's Stadium.

During the season, Liverpool broke or tied several Premier League all-time records. They achieved a record-equalling 18 consecutive wins before being defeated by Watford on 29 February. They also set records of 24 consecutive home wins, and a 25-point lead in the table at any time.

On 12 January 2020, in a 6–1 victory over Aston Villa, Manchester City's Sergio Agüero broke Thierry Henry's Premier League record for most goals scored by an overseas player. In the same match, he also broke the record for most hat-tricks scored by a single player (12), previously held by Alan Shearer.

Black Lives Matter impact 
As a gesture of solidarity following the murder of George Floyd, players' names on the back of their shirts were replaced with 'Black Lives Matter' for the first 12 matches of the restarted season as well as replacing the Premier League badge for the BLM's for the rest of the season. The Premier League also gave their support for any player who chooses to "take a knee" before or during matches. In addition, the NHS tribute badge was also used at all kits for the remainder of the season.

Relegation battle 
On 11 July 2020, Norwich City became the first team to be relegated to the Championship after a 4–0 defeat at home to West Ham United with three games remaining. On 26 July 2020, Bournemouth were the second team to be relegated to the Championship on the final day of the season, despite winning 3–1 away to Everton. Watford were the final team to be relegated to the Championship after losing 3–2 away to Arsenal on the same day. Both of these results were coupled with Aston Villa's 1–1 draw against West Ham United, ensuring Aston Villa safety in the Premier League for another season. Coincidentally, the three relegated teams were the same teams promoted to the Premier League for the 2015–16 season.

Effects of the COVID-19 pandemic
From March 2020, the season was affected by the COVID-19 pandemic. On 10 March, the match between Manchester City and Arsenal, due to be played the next day after being rescheduled due to City's participation in the 2020 EFL Cup Final, was postponed. A number of Arsenal players had made close contact with Olympiacos owner Evangelos Marinakis, who had tested positive for infection with the coronavirus, when the two teams had met in the Europa League 13 days earlier. It is the first football season in England to be halted since the 1939–40 season was abandoned after only three games following the outbreak of the Second World War.

On 12 March, it was revealed that three Leicester City players were self-isolating. Manchester City announced that their defender Benjamin Mendy was also self-isolating, after a family member displayed symptoms of the virus. Later in the evening, it was then confirmed that Arsenal head coach Mikel Arteta had tested positive for coronavirus. As a result of Arteta's positive test, the match between Brighton & Hove Albion and Arsenal, scheduled for 14 March at the Amex, was postponed. On 13 March, Chelsea announced that their winger Callum Hudson-Odoi had tested positive for coronavirus.

On 13 March, following an emergency meeting between the Premier League, The Football Association (FA), the English Football League and the FA Women's Super League, it was unanimously decided to suspend professional football in England until at least 4 April 2020. On 19 March, the suspension was extended to at least 30 April 2020. At the same time the FA agreed to extend the season indefinitely, past the scheduled end date of 1 June. In April 2020, the Secretary of State for Health and Social Care, Matt Hancock, called on Premier League players to take a pay cut during the pandemic. The PFA rejected the call as they felt that a cut for all players would impact the Exchequer with a loss of income tax revenue. Several clubs, including Watford, Southampton and West Ham United, all agreed to defer their wages. Later in April, the Premier League produced a plan, nicknamed "Project Restart", aimed at restarting the league and playing all 92 remaining matches over a six-week period at approved, neutral stadiums. Watford, Aston Villa and Brighton, all near the bottom of the table, were of the opinion that it would be unfair to play the games in such different conditions when at risk of relegation but would be more in favour if the threat of relegation was removed. From 19 May 2020, players were allowed to return to group training in preparation for restarting the league. They were permitted to be in groups of no more than five with all training sessions lasting no longer than 75 minutes for each player. Social distancing rules must be adhered to during the sessions.
On 17 and 18 May, a total of 748 players and staff were tested for COVID-19. Six tests proved positive including Adrian Mariappa of Watford and Burnley assistant manager, Ian Woan.
Later in May, Aaron Ramsdale of Bournemouth also returned a positive test for the virus.

A number of players, including Manchester City's Raheem Sterling and Sergio Agüero and Aaron Cresswell of West Ham United, voiced concerns relating to the safety of restarting the campaign. Danny Rose of Newcastle United called the decision to restart "a joke". Troy Deeney of Watford said he would not return to training because of fear for his family's health. N'Golo Kanté of Chelsea also missed training with safety concerns. On 27 May, the clubs voted unanimously to resume contact training. Aston Villa's Tyrone Mings said the players had not been consulted regarding restarting the league and that the restart was "financially driven".

On 28 May, clubs agreed that the season would restart on 17 June, with the two games in hand of Manchester City vs Arsenal and Aston Villa vs Sheffield United, with the first full round of fixtures since March to be played on the weekend of 19–21 June, with all matches played behind closed doors.  A plan was announced for all remaining matches to be televised, and to widen the availability of domestic broadcasts: for the first time, the BBC gained rights to broadcast four live matches on free-to-air television, while Sky announced plans to carry 25 matches on its free-to-air channel Pick. Amazon were allotted four matches. and announced it would provide a means of streaming them for free without an Amazon Prime subscription; on 18 June it was announced that these matches would be carried on its video game live streaming service Twitch.

On 4 June, the Premier League announced that teams would be allowed to name nine substitutes per match, instead of the usual seven, and that teams could use five substitutes per match instead of three.

Aston Villa vs. Sheffield United and Manchester City vs. Arsenal on 17 June were the first games played after the pandemic enforced break.

Financial services company Deloitte estimated that Premier League clubs would face a £1 billion loss of revenue for the 2019–20 season, £500 million being accounted for in rebates to broadcasters and loss of matchday revenue.

Further tests for the virus were carried out on 11 and 12 June. Two unnamed people provided a positive result including one player from Norwich City who would be required to self-isolate thereby missing the first fixture of the restarted season. Following these tests there had been 16 positive results from 8,687 tests.

Before the restart of games the Premier League produced a set of guidelines to be followed at all games. They stipulated that all matches must be played behind closed doors, with the number of key people allowed inside the stadium limited to 300. All stadiums are divided into three zones — red (includes pitch and technical areas), amber (stands) and green (stand concourses) — and there are restrictions on who is allowed to enter each. There is staggered entry on to the pitch for players and staff and no handshakes are allowed before kick-off. Deep cleaning of corner flags, goalposts, substitution boards and match balls takes place before and after each fixture as standard. Extra disinfection, such as of the substitution board after it is used, is likely during matches and at half-time. Additional measures include that players and coaching staff must observe social distancing rules when travelling to and from games, and post-match broadcast interviews must take place pitchside with press conferences conducted virtually.

Teams 
Twenty teams competed in the league – the top seventeen teams from the previous season and the three teams promoted from the Championship. The promoted teams were Norwich City, Sheffield United and Aston Villa. Norwich City and Aston Villa returned to the top flight after absences of three years, while Sheffield United returned after a twelve-year absence. They replaced Cardiff City, Fulham (both teams relegated after one season back in the top flight) and Huddersfield Town (relegated after two years in the top flight). Cardiff City's relegation means that this season was the first without a side from Wales since the 2010–11 season.

Stadiums and locations 

Note: Table lists in alphabetical order.

Personnel and kits

Managerial changes

League table

Results

Season statistics

Scoring

Top scorers

Hat-tricks 

Notes
4 Player scored 4 goals(H) – Home team(A) – Away team

Clean sheets

Discipline

Player 

 Most yellow cards: 12
  Luka Milivojević (Crystal Palace)

 Most red cards: 2
  Fernandinho (Manchester City)
  Christian Kabasele (Watford)
  David Luiz (Arsenal)

Club 

 Most yellow cards: 86
 Arsenal

 Most red cards: 5
 Arsenal

Awards

Monthly awards

Annual awards

References

External links 

 
 League and cup results for all the 2019/20 Premier Division clubs at footballsite

 
Premier League seasons
England
1
Premier League